REVSTAT is a peer-reviewed open access scientific journal that publishes papers related to statistics. It is published in English by the Instituto Nacional de Estatística, the national statistical office of Portugal. The journal was established in 2003, when it replaced the journal Revista de Estatística. It publishes two issues each year, both in print (subscription) and online as open access.

Abstracting and indexing 
REVSTAT is abstracted and indexed in Current Index to Statistics, Science Citation Index Expanded, MathSciNet, Statistical Theory and Method Abstracts, and Zentralblatt MATH.

External links 
 

Statistics journals
Publications established in 2003
Open access journals
English-language journals
Biannual journals